Alessandro Messina (born 1969) is an Italian economist and manager. His main fields of interest are nonprofit organizations, ethical banking and local development.

Part of the Italian team, he contributed to the Handbook on Non-Profit Institutions in the System of National Accounts, edited by the United Nations, New York (2003).

From 2001 to 2004 he has been President of the Italian Ethical Finance Association, who represented the national movement of citizens and operators active in ethical banking.

In 2006 the City of Rome received the European Enterprise Award by the European Commission for the programme aimed at promoting new small businesses in the suburbs, which Alessandro Messina managed from 2004 to 2007.

In 2014 he has been Italian Rapporteur to the G8 Social Impact Investment Taskforce.

From June 2015 to October 2021 he has been in charge of the General Management (CEO) at Banca Etica, the first bank active in promoting ethical banking in Italy, member of the Global Alliance for Banking on Values and of FEBEA, the European Federation of Ethical and Alternative Banks.

Essential bibliography

Fare il microcredito. Manuale per l'operatore, Bancaria editrice, 2015.

Servire lo Stato. Il mestiere del bravo burocrate, Edizioni dell'asino, 2009.

La finanza utile, with Paolo Andruccioli, Carocci, 2007.

La respuesta de las finanzas eticas en el mundo, with Cinzia Cimini, in Finanzas Y Economia Social, with contributions by Joseph Stiglitz and Muhammad Yunus, Editorial Altamira, 2005.

Denaro senza lucro. Manuale di gestione finanziaria per il terzo settore, editor and author, Carocci, 2003.

Italy. New welfare, new gaps, in The Social Impact of Globalisation in the World, Social Watch Report 2002.

Lavorare bene. Manuale sull'organizzazione e le forme di lavoro nel terzo settore, with a preface by Serge Latouche, Edizioni Lavoro, 1999.

All Alessandro Messina's articles and books are detailed on his personal website.

References

Italian economists
1969 births
Living people